Ólafur Darri Ólafsson (born 13 March 1973) is an Icelandic-American actor, producer, and screenwriter. He is known for Children, Trapped, The Deep, Lady Dynamite, and The Secret Life of Walter Mitty.

Early life
Ólafur was born to Icelandic parents in Connecticut, United States, where his father studied medicine. His family returned to Iceland when he was around four years old.

Career
Ólafur graduated from The Icelandic Drama School in 1998. Afterward, he became involved in numerous productions with the National Theatre of Iceland and Reykjavík City Theatre, also working with various independent theatre groups. He is one of the founders of Vesturport Theatre in Reykjavík.

Ólafur is best known internationally for his role as Andri, the chief of police in the small town of Seyðisfjörður in the east of Iceland, in the series Trapped. Baltasar Kormákur, who devised the series, has said that the actor was chosen because he was not a typical leading man. In the UK, the Guardian TV critic called his performance "as remarkable as the landscape".
Ólafsson himself has said that he based the character on his own father.

In June 2016, Ólafur lip synced in the music video for Winter Sound by the Icelandic band Of Monsters and Men.

In 2019, the actor was cast in AMC's series adaptation of Joe Hill's NOS4A2 as Bing Partridge.

Personal life
Ólafur is in a relationship with Icelandic dancer Lovísa Ósk Gunnarsdóttir. They have two daughters, born in 2010 and 2014.

Selected filmography

Film

Television

Video games

Awards and nominations

References

External links

 

Living people
1973 births
Male actors from Connecticut
American people of Icelandic descent
Icelandic male film actors
Icelandic male television actors
21st-century Icelandic male actors
20th-century Icelandic male actors
American male film actors
American male television actors
American male voice actors
20th-century American male actors
21st-century American male actors